Appleby is a locality in the Tasman district in the South Island of New Zealand. It is located around the Waimea River near the Tasman Bay / Te Tai-o-Aorere. It was first settled in the early 1840s. State Highway 60 passes through the settlement.

 There are three buildings in Appleby registered with Heritage New Zealand:
Springfield, a house on the corner of State Highway 60 and Cotterill Road, is registered as Category II with registration number 1646.
St Alban's Church on State Highway 60 is registered as Category II with registration number 1654.
Stafford Place at 61 Redwood Road is registered as Category I with registration number 1678.

In addition, the Redwood Racing Stables, which belonged to Stafford Place, were located on State Highway 60, and were relocated to Richmond, are registered as Category I with registration number 246.

Demographics

Appleby had a population of 786 at the 2018 New Zealand census, an increase of 3 people (0.4%) since the 2013 census, and an increase of 42 people (5.6%) since the 2006 census. There were 261 households. There were 411 males and 378 females, giving a sex ratio of 1.09 males per female. The median age was 44.2 years (compared with 37.4 years nationally), with 147 people (18.7%) aged under 15 years, 147 (18.7%) aged 15 to 29, 381 (48.5%) aged 30 to 64, and 114 (14.5%) aged 65 or older.

Ethnicities were 88.9% European/Pākehā, 11.5% Māori, 4.6% Pacific peoples, 2.3% Asian, and 2.3% other ethnicities (totals add to more than 100% since people could identify with multiple ethnicities).

The proportion of people born overseas was 14.5%, compared with 27.1% nationally.

Although some people objected to giving their religion, 57.3% had no religion, 30.9% were Christian, 0.8% were Buddhist and 1.1% had other religions.

Of those at least 15 years old, 87 (13.6%) people had a bachelor or higher degree, and 123 (19.2%) people had no formal qualifications. The median income was $31,200, compared with $31,800 nationally. The employment status of those at least 15 was that 336 (52.6%) people were employed full-time, 129 (20.2%) were part-time, and 21 (3.3%) were unemployed.

Education
Appleby School is a state primary school for years 1 to 6 students. It had a roll of  students as of  The school opened on the current site in 1859.

References

Populated places in the Tasman District
Populated places around Tasman Bay / Te Tai-o-Aorere